Timothy Philip Russell (born 27 February 1958) is a former English cricketer.  Russell was a right-handed batsman who fielded as a wicket-keeper.  He was born in High Wycombe, Buckinghamshire.

Russell made his debut for Buckinghamshire in the 1981 Minor Counties Championship against Norfolk.  Russell played Minor counties cricket for Buckinghamshire from 1981 to 2000, which included 61 Minor Counties Championship matches and 9 MCCA Knockout Trophy matches.  In 1985, he made his List A debut against Somerset in the NatWest Trophy.  He played two further List A matches for Buckinghamshire, against Sussex in the 1992 NatWest Trophy and Leicestershire in the 1993 NatWest Trophy.  In his 3 List A matches, he scored 36 runs at a batting average of 12.00, with a high score of 23.

He also played Second XI cricket for the Middlesex Second XI in 1976.

References

External links
Timothy Russell at ESPNcricinfo
Timothy Russell at CricketArchive

1958 births
Living people
Sportspeople from High Wycombe
People from Buckinghamshire
English cricketers
Buckinghamshire cricketers
Wicket-keepers